Stargell can refer to:
Willie Stargell (1940-2001), American baseball player
Tony Stargell (born 1966), American football player